Põhja-Tallinn (Estonian for "Northern Tallinn") is one of the 8 administrative districts of Tallinn, the capital of Estonia.

Subdistricts
Põhja-Tallinn is divided into 9 subdistricts: Kalamaja, Karjamaa, Kelmiküla, Kopli, Merimetsa, Paljassaare, Pelgulinn, Pelguranna and Sitsi.

Population
The population in Põhja-Tallinn was 59,857 as of 1 January 2021.

Gallery

References

External links

Districts of Tallinn